Cataclysm: Dark Days Ahead (CDDA) is an open-source roguelike video game. Cataclysm: Dark Days Ahead is a fork of the original game Cataclysm. The game is freely downloadable on the game's website and the source code is also freely available on the project's GitHub repository under the CC BY-SA Creative Commons license. The game is currently largely developed by its community. Rock, Paper, Shotgun named CDDA one of "The 50 Best Free Games on PC" in 2016.

The game is text-based, though alternative graphical tilesets are available. Prior to playing, the player generates a world which can be shared between different characters. The player then creates a character and is placed into one of many possible starting scenarios. The player is then free to do whatever they please. This includes both things required for day-to-day survival such as scavenging, hunting, and finding shelter, as well as larger goals such as farming, installing bionics, making and repairing vehicles, and constructing homes.

Plot 
The game is set in near-future New England after a catastrophic event killed most of the human population and spawned various monsters and hazards. After a UFO crash in the '90s, the US government began to research alternate dimensions. In their explorations they obtained a sample called “XE-037”, a mysterious black goo known as the blob that was able to reanimate the dead and cause targeted phenotype mutations. XE-037 escaped the lab environment, causing an enormous zombie outbreak and manipulating the population through people's moods, making many people violent. In the following months, the world began to further spiral out of control, with mass demonstrating, rioting, and internal deployment of troops. Amidst the chaos, Earth became the target of a multidimensional portal attack, leading to vast portal storms, with portals opening all over the world, affecting the weather and the reality around them. Unknown forces from other dimensions entered opportunistically as our dimensional fabric was destabilized. 

A US government official managed to get access to the emergency broadcast system, and send out a final message. “The government has fallen. No help is coming, you’re on your own.” Many consider this to be the day the world ended. This event is referred to as "The Cataclysm". Though the cataclysm is predominantly a zombie apocalypse, many other disastrous events are going on, including invasions from fungi, Triffids, Lovecraftian monsters such as Mi-Gos that have built encampments and towers around the world, and caves containing sewer rats and a rat king.

Prior to the cataclysm, robots were becoming widespread in various workplaces such as hospitals, police stations, and mines.

Development 
Cataclysm: Dark Days Ahead is based on the earlier game Cataclysm whose source code was made open-source under the Creative Commons CC BY-SA license on GitHub by the original author Whales in October 2010. After the Cataclysm author ended the development around 2012, the game's community forked the game into a new repository called Cataclysm: Dark Days Ahead in early 2013.

In June 2013, a successful crowdfunding on Kickstarter raised $9,492 (beyond the $7,000 goal) for the payment of a full-time developer for 3.5 months.

The game is made with ncurses to provide text based graphics; later a Simple DirectMedia Layer (SDL) version with graphical tiles became available.

The game is under heavy development with experimental releases available multiple times each day.  However, the stable versions are considered "snapshots" of development rather than the primary version, with the daily updated experimental branch being the "master" version of the game.

In December 2015, an unofficial launcher was created for CDDA under an open-source MIT license to allow players to stay up to date with the latest releases and third-party mods. However, the launcher was confirmed unmaintained since January, 2022.

Gameplay 
Unlike most roguelikes, it has no goal: the player is free to explore the procedurally generated map, clear areas of monsters, work with NPCs, and build shelters and vehicles. The gameplay is mainly based on day-to-day survival, and the game tracks parameters like hunger, thirst, morale, illness and temperature which the player must manage to stay alive. The game also manages numerous other mechanics about the player including drug addiction, mutations, broken limbs, and bionic implants.

World 

The world can be persistent between games. When starting a new character after the death of a previous character, the new game can be set in the same game world as the last. The world has support for seasons and dynamic weather conditions, and the season lengths can be modified during world generation. Recent weather conditions/events added include the portal storms, which were initially only mentioned in the main storyline for CDDA, during these portal storms, nether monsters will appear and can cause negative effects on the player when they get caught outdoors during the storm if not outright kill them, but during the portal storms, a dungeon will appear, this dungeon can grant the player unique temporary status effects or items by travelling through it successfully.

A typical CDDA world has cities, towns, rivers, forests, bridges and other landmarks. Cities and towns generally have several common establishments often found in the real world such as houses, stores, malls, parking lots, swimming pools, hospitals, and more, but hold danger in the form of large hordes. Rarer locations such as labs, military bases, and missile silos can be found in remote places throughout the world. Latest versions have support for three-dimensional buildings.

While most of the action in CDDA is liable to happen on the surface overworld, as traditional with roguelikes, the world does contain underground dungeons. Examples of these include mines, labs, and strange temples.

Character 

Characters can be generated randomly or can be custom-built to suit player gameplay and preferences. Players choose from several available initial scenarios. The default scenario is "Evacuee" in which the player starts from an evacuation center with few provisions. Choosing harder scenarios awards the player with points with which they can create more powerful characters.

Like most roguelikes, the game allows players to initially choose from various professions and each profession has its own set of traits and skills. In character creation, positive traits can be chosen by consuming points, and stats like strength and intelligence and skills like archery can also be increased through spending points. Negative traits earn the player more points to spend on positive traits, stats or skills. Traits that have a greater impact on gameplay have more points associated with them, ranging from minor traits like "Tough Feet" and "Clumsy" to game-changing traits like "Night Vision" or "Kaluptic Psychosis", which causes hallucinations, and even "Nyctophobia", which hinders the ability to enter dark areas and causes bad effects if caught out in darkness. Characters can increase their skills gradually once in-game by practicing the respective skills or reading books obtained from various sources found within the cities or towns, or degrade over time with disuse if the optional skill rust system is enabled.

The game has a menu which shows the character's current conditions such as hunger, thirst, morale or any existing illness from which the character is suffering. In order to survive, the character has to consume food and water often, and sleep on a regular basis. If afflicted with an illness, the player must use certain medications in order to treat the diseases, most diseases can recover their own, but some others can only be removed with the right medication, or vice versa. The menu also displays the character's stats.

Crafting 

Unlike most roguelikes, CDDA focuses heavily on crafting, with many basic necessities such as clothing and food being craftable from raw items that are found lying around the world. For crafting to be successful the player needs the necessary raw materials and equipment. The player also needs to learn the recipe of the object to be crafted, which can be unlocked by reading books from libraries. Successful crafting leads to an increase of the corresponding skill. Craftable items are classified into Weapons, Ammo, Food, Chemicals, Armor and Other, with several subcategories in each of them.

Crafting can be hampered by player conditions such as low morale or other external game conditions like insufficient light or the presence of monsters nearby.

Construction 

CDDA features an intricate construction menu where one can perform activities ranging from simple construction, like boarding up a window or digging a pit, to elaborate ones like building a reinforced concrete wall, digging a well or creating basements. Like crafting, construction requires raw materials like brick, stones, or nails. Equipment required for construction can be either salvaged from cities or can be crafted via the crafting menu from additional raw materials. For the most part, the terrain in the game is fully destructible, meaning that the player and other entities can destroy it or build structures on it.

Vehicles can be repaired or even built from scratch using the construction menu. Players are reported to have created vehicles of quite different sizes and capabilities, from small quad bikes with limited storage  to huge "deathmobiles" with multiple engines, turrets, machine guns, and chemical labs.

Farming 
The player can farm land and grow grains, vegetables, berries and other shrubs (e.g. cotton), provided that they find the respective seeds. The final crop can be laid up for later use (though some food may perish), it can be eaten raw or can be used to prepare more elaborate products (e.g. cooking oil, flour, spirits, vinegar, sealed food).

The farming season usually extends from late spring to early autumn and depends on external temperature. Every plant type has different growing rates and growth can be accelerated using commercial or home-made fertilizers. Final output depends on the character's survival skill: the higher the skill, the higher the yield of every single plant. Once harvested, all plants are considered "dead" and leave straw (grains) or withered plants and some seeds.

Creatures 
There are a plethora of monsters and creatures found in the world. The wilderness contains many animals, ranging from small passive animals such as squirrels, rabbits, and rats, to large aggressive predators and sometimes hostile herbivores ranging from moose to wolves and bears. These animals can be hunted for their meat, fur, bones, and organs for cooking and sometimes chemistry.

The main threats to the characters are the zombies that roam mainly the cities and some areas within the wilderness. Zombies come in many shapes, abilities  and sizes, and most (but not all of them) are infamous for their ability to revive for some time if they are not butchered or smashed to a pulp. The game also features a wide range of adversaries ranging from mutant humans and animals to aliens and interdimensional creatures, often inspired by the works of H. P. Lovecraft and other popular horror and science fiction genres.

As the days go on, many zombies and creatures will mutate into more powerful forms, progressively increasing difficulty. Mundane animals may be replaced with zombie or mutant versions, further reducing access to edible meat while making the world more hostile.

Reception 
The game's reception by gaming websites was overwhelmingly positive. Rock, Paper, Shotgun named it number 39 of "The 50 Best Free Games on PC" in October 2016.

See also

 List of open source games
 List of roguelikes

References

External links 

 

2013 video games
Android (operating system) games
IOS games
Linux games
MacOS games
Windows games
Virtual economies
Creative Commons-licensed video games
Roguelike video games
Open-source video games
Software that uses ncurses
Cross-platform software
Survival video games
Video games developed in the United States
Freeware games
Science fiction video games
Post-apocalyptic video games
2010s horror video games
Role-playing video games
Video games about zombies
Video games about robots
Video games about the paranormal
Video games about extraterrestrial life